The discography of Turnover, an American rock band, consists of four studio albums, four extended plays, six music videos and five appearances on compilation and split albums. The band was formed in 2009 in Virginia Beach, Virginia and released their eponymous extended play two years later on Broken Rim Records. This first project has been described as emo and pop punk. In 2012, the band signed to Run for Cover Records and put out a split with Citizen. The next year, Turnover released their debut album, Magnolia, on Run for Cover Records. Magnolia reached number 15 on the Top Heatseekers chart, but failed to chart on the Billboard 200. In 2014, the band released their second extended play, Blue Dream, on Broken Rim Records.

Turnover released their second album, Peripheral Vision, on Run For Cover Records. The album sold well, reaching number 4 on the Top Heatseekers chart and number 15 on the Independent Albums chart. Peripheral Vision was a break from the band's earlier work moving in a more dream pop direction. The same year, the band released an extended play of their Audiotree session. Humblest Pleasures, a two-song extended play, was released in 2016. Eric Soucy was dismissed from the band in 2017, due to allegations of emotional abuse. The same year, Turnover's third album, Good Nature, came out. The album is Turnover's best selling record, reaching number 79 on the Billboard 200 and number 5 on the Independent Albums chart. In 2019, Altogether, Turnover's fourth album, was released. It sold worse than Good Nature and did not crack the Billboard 200, but reached number 4 on the Top Heatseekers chart and number 13 on the Independent Albums chart.

Studio albums

Extended plays

Singles

Music videos

Appearances on compilations and splits

References

Pop punk group discographies
Discographies of American artists